The following is a list of media in Sioux Falls, South Dakota, United States:

Print

Daily
Argus Leader

Weekly
Link
Sioux Falls Business Journal
Sioux Falls Shopping News

Other
City Style (monthly)
ETC, For Her (monthly)
 'Good Life (monthly)
Last Call Magazine (bimonthly)
Prime (monthly)
Sioux Falls Woman Magazine (bimonthly)
The Sioux Falls Headliner
The Soo Foo

Television
The Sioux Falls market is the 113th largest TV market in the United States (as ranked by Nielsen).

Radio

AM

FM

See also
List of television stations in South Dakota

References

Sioux Falls
 
Media in Sioux Falls
Sioux Falls